National Road 48 (abbreviated as EO48) is a single carriageway road in central Greece. It connects the Greek National Road 5 at Antirrio with the town Livadeia, passing through Naupactus and Delphi. The section between  Antirrio and Itea is part of European route E65. The GR-48 passes through the regional units Aetolia-Acarnania, Phocis and Boeotia.

Route
The western end of the GR-48 is at the north side of the Rio-Antirrio bridge, in Antirrio. It runs east along the north shore of the Gulf of Corinth, and bypasses the port town Nafpaktos. It keeps following the coast through Galaxidi and Itea, where it leaves the coast. The GR-27 branches off towards Amfissa and Lamia north of Itea. The GR-48 continues east through Delphi and Arachova. It ends in Livadeia, where it is connected with the GR-3.There are 5 tunnels on the road 48, 3 tunnels near Nafpaktos (xiropigado tunnel 500m), a 200m tunnel near Delphi, and a 300m tunnel near Livadia (Karakolithos tunnel).

National Road 48 passes through the following places:

Antirrio
Nafpaktos (bypass)
Erateini
Galaxidi
Itea
Delphi 
Livadeia

48
Roads in Western Greece
Roads in Central Greece